In psychiatry and psychology, euthymia is a normal, tranquil mental state or mood. 

In those with bipolar disorder, euthymia is a stable mental state or mood that is neither manic nor depressive, yet distinguishable from the state of healthy people. Euthymia is also the “baseline” of other cyclical mood disorders like major depressive disorder (MDD), as well as borderline personality disorder (BPD) and narcissistic personality disorder (NPD).  This state is the goal of psychiatric and psychological interventions.

The term euthymia is derived from the Greek words “eu”, well, and “thymo”, soul or emotion. The word “thymos” also had four additional meanings: life energy; feelings and passions; desires and inclinations; and thought or intelligence. Euthymia is also derived from a verb, “euthymeo”, that means both “I am happy, in good spirits” and “I make others happy, I reassure and encourage”. This is the basis on which the first formal definition of euthymia was built.

Democritus, who coined the philosophical concept of euthymia, said that euthymia is achieved when “one is satisfied with what is present and available, taking little heed of people who are envied and admired and observing the lives of those who suffer and yet endure”. This was later amended in the translation given by the Roman philosopher Seneca the Younger in which euthymia means a state of internal calm and contentment. Seneca was also the first to link the state of euthymia to a learning process; in order to achieve it, one must be aware of psychological well-being. Seneca’s definition included a cache about detachment from current events. Later, the Greek biographer Plutarch removed this cache with his definition which focused more on learning from adverse events.

In 1958, Marie Jahoda gave a modern clinical definition of mental health in the terms of positive symptoms by outlining the criteria for mental health: “autonomy (regulation of behavior from within), environmental mastery, satisfactory interactions with other people and the milieu, the individual’s style and degree of growth, development or self-actualization, the attitudes of an individual toward his/her own self”. In her definition she acknowledged the absence of disease as being necessary, but not enough, to constitute positive mental health, or euthymia.

Carol Ryff (1989) was the first to develop a comprehensive scale that could assess euthymia: the six-factor model of psychological well-being. The 84-item scale includes facets of self-acceptance, positive relations with others, autonomy, environmental mastery, purpose in life, and personal growth. It did not include a notion of resilience, which people in the field started working to add in the 2000s.

Parathymia, on the other hand, is related to pathological laughter (called “Witzelsucht”).

See also 
 Cyclothymia
 Hyperthymia
 Dysphoria 
 Euphoria
 Euthymia (philosophy)
 Hypomania
 Major depressive disorder
 Mania
 Quality of life

References 

Happiness
Medical signs